Nicholas Tobin Roth (born April 24, 1985) is an American screenwriter and actor. He is the son of film and television director, Bobby Roth.

Early life
Roth was born in 1985 and grew up in Los Angeles to parents in the film industry (his father is a director, his mother worked in distribution). In 1997's television film The Devil's Child which his father directed, he played the role of Sam.

In 2002's television film Crossed Over which his father directed, he played the role of Diane Keaton's son.

He went to grad school for his PhD in English at Cornell University. Then he had been in China for several months and there developed the adapted screenplay for Chronicles of the Ghostly Tribe which ranked among top 20 of box office record in 2015 China.

His short film Coming To won the jury's Grand Prize for Fearless Filmmaking at 2015's Slamdance Film Festival. Quote: "Digital Bolex Fearless Filmmaking Grand Prize: Coming To, dir. by Lindsey Haun, DP Spencer Rollins, starring Jacob Demonte-Finn" – 'A film that includes a little bit of everything in a very short time. Mystery, laughs, an impressive performance, and some mighty fine camerawork and cinematography. And like any great short film, it has you desperately wanting to know what happens next.' The award winner was granted a 512gb Digital Bolex D16 Camera."

Filmography

Works as a screenwriter
Chronicles of the Ghostly Tribe　（directed by Lu Chuan）

Short film
Coming To (also as a producer) (directed by Lindsey Haun)

As an actor
Berkeley – Ben (hero)
''Manhood – Charlie

References

External links

American male screenwriters
Cornell University alumni
1985 births
Living people
Male actors from Los Angeles
Screenwriters from California